Berlin-Buch (in German Bahnhof Berlin-Buch) is a railway station in the borough of Pankow, in Berlin, Germany. It is served by the Berlin S-Bahn and local bus lines.

Notes

External links
Station information 

Berlin S-Bahn stations
Railway stations in Berlin
Buildings and structures in Pankow